Sydney Technical High School (STHS) is a government-funded single-sex academically selective secondary day school for boys, located in Bexley, a southern suburb of Sydney, New South Wales, Australia. Founded in 1911 as part of Sydney Technical College, the school was one of the six original New South Wales selective schools and caters for boys from Year 7 to Year 12. The school is colloquially abbreviated to Sydney Tech, STHS or simply Tech.

Admission to Year 7 is based on an external selective test held in Year 6 during March. Admissions for new students to Years 8, 9, 10 and 11 are restricted to filling any vacant places created by the loss of current students.

Academic achievement
The school consistently achieves superior results in external assessments, such as the NAPLAN, the ICAS, the Record of School Achievement, and in particular, the Year 12 Higher School Certificate (HSC), where its students are regularly ranked in the top ten places in the state across a variety of subjects. On average, over 80% of its students achieve in the top 20% of the state, with a majority gaining an Australian Tertiary Admission Rank of more than 90.

In 2010 fifteen students from the school's graduating class received Premier's Awards for All-round Excellence in the NSW HSC. The school won the national championship in the University of Newcastle Science and Engineering Challenge in 2010 (gold division) and 2011 (silver division).

History 

One of the reforms advocated by the 1903 Royal Commission into NSW Education was the establishment of classes providing courses which would involve technical subjects. Consequently, Continuation classes for students interested in technical subjects commenced at the Sydney Technical College.

In April 1911, these Continuation classes were given the status of a high school, and Sydney Technical High was established. Originally, the school was co-educational with 113 boys and 15 girls. In February 1913, the girls were transferred to Fort Street Girls' High; and, from then on, the school became for boys only.

Since 1911, the school has been located at three Sydney sites:
Ultimo House on Mary Ann Street: this was the "country" home of John Harris, Surgeon of the New South Wales Corps. The property was bought by the Government in 1899 and used by Technical Education for many years before being used by Sydney Tech High from 1911 to 1924.
Paddington on Albion Street: in 1925, with an enrolment of 421, Sydney Tech High was transferred to Albion Street, Paddington. Although it was a note of expansion, it was a vigorous P&C campaign that encouraged the State Government to fund an entirely new site for the school.
Bexley on Forest Road: the Old McConnachie's Paddock was occupied and first stone for the school's foundations was laid in March 1955, with the school completed and occupied by September 1956. The official opening for the school's new facilities was on 2 August 1958, with four units: the administration block, general classrooms ('A block'), manual training block and the auditorium and gymnasium. Throughout the years numerous additions have been made to the site. The School Pool was opened in 1966, the Kingston-David Library and Laboratories in 1975 and a brand-new administration block in 1998.

Facilities 
The current grounds at Bexley include the following physical facilities:
 Upper courts and Lower Courts ("The Cage") – basketball courts for Years 7–9 and 10–12, respectively
 Elmo Landsberger Cricket nets – located between Lower courts and Back oval, 3 cricket batting nets & a plaque dedicated to Elmo Landsberger
 Anderson Street courts – A new basketball court as well as 3 small handball courts and a volleyball court has been put in, near the Anderson Street car park. The construction was completed in May 2009.
 Botanical and Rainforest area
 Sir Charles Kingsford Smith Memorial Library
 Auditorium for School Assemblies and performances
 Gymnasium with indoor basketball courts
 Matthew Goodall Memorial Garden - Adjacent the library
 Sun Shelter between the Cafeteria and the industrial works classrooms. The shelter was completed as of March 2015.
 Vera's Gym - A physical gymnasium dedicated for outside classroom learning and relaxation. It is often used by PASS and SLR students as well as seniors.
The passive – 3 table tennis tables and various benches outside the library. Completed recently in early 2018.

Faculties

Extra-curricular activities 
Extracurricular activities offered to Sydney Technical High School students include:
P&C Association and Student Fundraising
Debating Teams
Student Representative Council (SRC)
Interact – A group dedicated to charity fundraising
Sound and Lighting Crew – A group of students who, under teacher supervision, dedicate their time to the continued maintenance and functioning of the auditorium and drama studio systems.
FRED – The former, award-winning school newspaper run solely by students at the school. FRED returned temporarily after remaining dormant from 2005 to 2007. There was a temporary revival with the release of editions between 2008 and 2009; and once again in 2013 and 2014. FRED is no longer the school newspaper and has been, for all intents and purposes, replaced by the Tech High Times. However, there are talks of a relaunch for year 11&12 students as a senior alternative to the junior paper.
Tech High Times - A journalism society for students in years 7–10 that intends to produce tabloid editions each term. 
Digital Media Team - A film-making, photography group founded in 2018 by Nestor Harilaou, tasked with creating various multimedia presentations for school events. "A day at Tech." is regarded as their debut video, showing future Techies what school will be like.  The leader of the DMT as of 2019 is Emmanuel Takla.
Public speaking – including Inter-School and grade-wide competitions
Links Program – A group of year 9 students work with students from Hurstville Primary School, to show them what happens in high school and create links between the two schools. It is run by the history, science, creative arts/LOTE faculties.
ISCF – Inter-School Christian Fellowship run by the students under teacher supervision
Chess – Inter-School Chess Competition also in session.
Committees of Year 12 organisation – for collaborating the Year 12 Yearbook, Formal, Year 12 End of Year Video and Jerseys
School Bands – Beginner, Intermediate, Concert, Stage, String Ensemble, Choir
Environment Team
Centenary School Scholarships - Senior, Intermediate and Junior categories
Department of Education's Great Schools Showoff short film competition - 2012 Sydney Regional winners and 2nd at State Finals
Chemistry Titration Competition
ICAS competitions
Rio Tinto Big Science Competition
The SRC also organise various activities throughout the year, including:
Pizza Day
Talent Quest
Family Feud (c. 2019)
Years 7–10 Scavenger Hunt

Sport 
Tech is one of the 19 schools of the St. George Secondary Schools Sport Association, participating in inter-school competitions for sports including:

Summer 

Cricket
 Basketball
 Table Tennis
 Touch football
Beach volleyball
Mini soccer

Winter 
 Oztag
 Volleyball
 Field Hockey
 Soccer
 Tennis
Students also have the choice of participating in the following non-grade sports:
 Water Polo
 Fencing
Fitness
 Rotation
 Tennis
Tenpin

Student life

Annual activities
The school's annual activities include:
The "Celebrity" Human Movement Challenge
Combined SRC Dance between Sydney Tech and St George Girls High School
Musicale (School bands, music student groups and soloists)
Senior Trivia Night (Prefecture)
Jorge Diaz Wombi Ball Cup (Prefecture)
SRC Week – Various activities such as Pizza Day, Talent Quest, Family Feud and Counter-Strike Competition
Year 10 Formal (Formal Committee)
Year 11 Social (Formal Committee)
Year 12 Formal (Formal Committee)
Annual Talent Quest
40 Hour Famine
World's Greatest Shave
TechFest - Short film competition - Senior and Junior divisions
Tech Cup
Year 12 House Soccer Cup

Prefects
As of 2008, the Prefect Body has been merged with the year 11 and 12 SRC members. The current system encompasses School Captain, Vice Captain, four Senior Prefects, an additional six Prefects from year twelve and another ten Prefects from year eleven.  Senior Prefect roles and Captain roles are only available to holders of the school's Wykeham Award.  The Vice-Captain chairs whole school assemblies.  The Prefects of years 11 and 12 are responsible for canteen duties.

The SRC votes internally to determine the positions of the SRC president, the SRC vice-president and the SRC treasurer. The stated role of the SRC is to organize and raise funds for equipment and facilities for the school.

House system
There has been a reintroduced house system, consisting of 6 houses. These correlate with the six Roll Call classes and are named, Williams, Turner, McMullen, MacKinnon, Broome and Gotto. The House Captains are elected from Years 10 and 12. The roll call classes are arranged according to the students' surnames. Students compete together in their houses at the Athletics carnivals, Cross country carnivals, and Swimming carnivals. The winning house is the one with the most points gathered from participating and placing in the top 3 in various carnival events, and receives a sausage sizzle at the end of the year.

Notable achievements

Australian Nuclear Science Competition 
Sydney Technical High School won a competition that tested skills in a science and engineering challenge. Students competed in the regional competition at the Australian Nuclear Science and Technology Organisation (ANSTO) recently.

The event encouraged teenagers to get involved in maths and science and promote careers in the fields. Part of the challenge involved constructing a bionic hand. More than 250-year 9 and year 10 students from seven Sydney schools participated.

Canberra Maths Day 
173 Year 12 students from 31 schools attended the 2014 Maths Day national finals. In teams of four the students took part in mathematical challenges designed to build teamwork skills and promote a love of maths. The day was divided into four challenges: a group of story problems, a Swiss 'find the rule' problem, a cross number puzzle and the day's highlight, the relay – a test of brainpower and physical stamina. 2nd prize was awarded to Sydney Technical High School and the competition is run annually by the Australian National University.

Metropolitan Secondary Schools Chess Competition 
In 2014, the senior division of the Metropolitan Secondary Schools Competition was won by Sydney Technical High School.

Associated schools
St George Girls High School is considered to be the female counterpart or 'sister school' of Sydney Technical High School, and often engages in Student Representative Council activities, as well as Combined Parents & Citizens meetings.

The school has a relationship with Nanzan High School in Japan, with a two-week exchange program in place.

Notable alumni
Alumni are referred to as Old Boys. Alumni are part of the "STHS Old Boys Union".

Aviation
 Sir Charles Kingsford Smith – pioneering aviator

Entertainment and the arts
 Trevor Ashley - Australian entertainer
 Alex Dimitriades – actor
 Stephen Edgar - poet
 Les Gock – musician
 Mark Isaacs - classical and jazz pianist, composer
 Clive James – Australian author, critic, broadcaster, poet and translator
 Patrick Matthews – musician
 Leo McKern – actor
 Leonardo Nam – actor
William Pidgeon - artist and Archibald Prize winner
 Imants Tillers – artist; Class of 1968
 Mike Tomalaris – journalist, TV presenter

Politics, religion and law
 Cecil Abbott  – Commissioner of the New South Wales Police (1981–1984)
 Sir Robert Askin – Premier of New South Wales
Francis Oag Hulme-Moir – 7th Bishop of Nelson
 Stephen Loosley - Former ALP Senator
Sir John Leslie Carrick - Former NSW Liberal Senator
Bruce Kenneth Childs - Former NSW Labor Senator
Scott Farlow  - Current Member of the Legislative Council in NSW 
Wes Davoren - Former Labor MP for New South Wales
 Bruce McDonald – former Leader of the Opposition of New South Wales (1981)
 Graham Richardson – former Senator (ALP) (1983–1994); Environment Minister (1987–1993); Health Minister (1992) during Bob Hawke's term of office as Prime Minister.
Eugene Kamenka - Influential Australian political philosopher and notable Marxist scholar. 
William Withers - Former Liberal Member of the Parliament of Western Australia

Sport
 Dick Crealy - Grand Slam-winning tennis player and Australia Davis Cup team member
 Reg Gasnier – Rugby league player
 John Konrads – Olympic gold-medallist swimmer and businessman
 Stephen Wooldridge – Olympic cyclist (gold medallist 2004 Olympics); class of 1995
 Greg Pierce - Rugby League Australian Captain

Others
David Coe - Australian businessman
 Saul Griffith - Australian-American inventor
 Max Howell - educator and rugby union player

Notable teachers
 Kelver Hartley - modern languages and classics teacher (1948–55)
Patrick Matthews – musician

See also 

 List of government schools in New South Wales
 List of selective high schools in New South Wales

References

External links

Official Sydney Technical High School FRED Facebook Page
Official site of STHS FRED digital publications
Official Site of Tech High Times digital publications
Class of 1984 web site (includes many documents and photographs to do with Sydney Technical High School from 1979 to 1984).

Educational institutions established in 1911
Public high schools in Sydney
Boys' schools in New South Wales
Georges River Council
1911 establishments in Australia
School buildings completed in 1911
Selective schools in New South Wales